Obersulm is a municipality in the district of Heilbronn, Baden-Württemberg, Germany, formed in the 1970s as a merger of the formerly independent municipalities Affaltrach, Eichelberg, Eschenau, Sülzbach, Weiler, and Willsbach.  It is situated 12 km east of Heilbronn. Its name refers to its geographical location in the upper ("Ober-") valley of the small river Sulm.

The nineteenth-century synagogue has been restored.

See also
 Jews in Affaltrach

References

Heilbronn (district)